The Troy Trojans softball team represents Troy University in NCAA Division I college softball. The team participates in the Sun Belt Conference.  The Trojans play their home games at Troy Softball Complex located on the university's campus.  The program is one of the Top 50 winningest softball programs in the Division I, and has an overall record of 988–660–4 as of the end of the 2021 season.

History
Upon Troy University's athletics moving all sports to the NCAA's Division I in 1993, the Troy softball program was started that same year and officially began their first season in 1994 under head coach Melanie Davis.  Under Davis' leadership, the program immediately became a competitive softball program, finishing their first season in Division I with a 40–13 record, including a 4–3 win over an already prominent program in Georgia Tech.

In just Troy's third season of playing softball (1996), the team managed to make history by winning their first ever conference title and receiving a bid to play in an NCAA Regional.  The team finished the season with a 47–22–1 record, winning the Mid-Continent Conference tournament title.  The Lady Trojans would receive a bid to play in the NCAA Play-In Series versus Southeast Missouri State, where they would sweep the Redhawks by scores of 3–2 and 1–0.  The ladies would then receive a bid to play in the NCAA West Regional as the #4 seed.  In their first game against Arizona, the Trojans were outmatched, losing 0–8 to the Wildcats.  The Trojans were knocked out of the tournament after dropping a heartbreaker in the Regional's elimination game against South Florida, 5–6.

Melanie Davis would resign as head coach of Troy at the end of the 2014 season, compiling a 780–506–4 record.  Under Davis' direction, her Trojans defeated many Top 25 teams and other prominent programs, including Florida State, Louisiana, Auburn, Georgia Tech, Nebraska, Michigan, Ole Miss, and Penn State.

In 2015, Beth Mullins was hired as head coach where she led the Trojans to 208 victories in her eight seasons, 30 or more wins in the last three seasons, and a trip to the 2021 NCAA Tournament, a first in 25 years. Mullins abruptly resigned in March 2022 following medical issues.  Assistants Taylor Smartt and Holly Ward finished the season at the helm of the program. On June 2, Troy hired Auburn–Montgomery head coach Eric Newell as the program's third head coach. Newell led the Warhawks to three top 5 finishes in the NCAA Division II and 302 victories with the program.

Coaches

Attendance Records

NCAA Top 50 Attendance

Highest Game Attendance
Below is a list of Troy's top single-game attendance records.

Facilities
The place the Trojans call home is the Troy Softball Complex, built in 2002 on the campus of Troy University.  In 2014, the entire complex underwent a $3 million renovation project.  The official seating capacity was expanded to 800, with 120 of the seats being chairback seating.  The Dodds Center was also built in 2014 during the renovation, which is an 8,000 sq. ft. state-of-the-art facility that houses coaches offices, player lounge, locker rooms, athletic training rooms, pitching area, and indoor batting cages.

Additionally, the natural grass playing surface was replaced and ProGrass artificial turf was installed in the outfield.  The press box and coaches offices were completely renovated and modernized.  The Troy Softball Complex saw an upgrade to the seating areas and a large patio was installed over the visitor's dugout.

Wins vs. Top 25
Troy has collected 24 wins versus Top 25 ranked competition during the program's relatively short existence.

All rankings from NFCA Coaches' Poll

Yearly Results

Championships
 1996 – Mid-Continent Conference Tournament Champions
 1999 – Atlantic Sun Conference West Division Champions
 2005 – Atlantic Sun Conference Regular Season Champions

NCAA Regional Results

References